Zviad Tarielovich Kupatadze (Russian: Звиад Тариелович Купатадзе; Georgian: ზვიად კუპატაძე; born ) is a Georgian futsal player, playing as a goalkeeper. He is part of the Georgian national futsal team. At club level he played for Gazprom-Ugra in Russia.

Honors
 UEFA Futsal Champions League: 2015–16
 Russian Futsal Super League (3): 2014–15, 2017–18, 2021–22
 Runner-up (5): 2007–08, 2012–13, 2013–14, 2015–16, 2019–20
 Third place (4): 2006–07, 2008–09, 2011–12, 2016–17
 Russian Cup (5): 2007–08, 2012–13, 2013–14, 2015–16, 2019–20
 Russian Super Cup: 2022
 European Futsal Cup Winners Cup: 2012

References

External links
 Zviad Kupatadze (AMFR)

1979 births
Living people
Futsal goalkeepers
Russian people of Georgian descent